Paristiopterus gallipavo, the yellowspotted boarfish, brown-spotted boarfish, giant boarfish or yellow-spotted penfish, is a species of marine ray-finned fish, an armourhead from the family Pentacerotidae. It is a carnivorous species which is endemic to the temperate seas of southern Australia where its range extends from Carnarvon, Western Australia to the Investigator Strait in South Australia.

References

Pentacerotidae
Fish described in 1944